Business Action for Energy (BAE) is a business network set up to give input to the UN Commission on Sustainable Development.

The Business Action for Sustainable Development (BASD) was a temporary initiative developed around the World Summit on Sustainable Development (WSSD, Johannesburg, 2002). This initiative was a resounding success and this model for positive business co-operation has since received much support around the world. 

Businesses positive involvement must be continued in the international debate and on-the-ground projects, through partnerships and initiatives that can make a significant contribution to the achievement of the Millennium Development Goals and the Johannesburg Declaration.

Set up in January 2005 by three founding organizations - the International Chamber of Commerce (ICC), the World Business Council for Sustainable Development (WBCSD) and the World Energy Council (WEC) - Business Action for Energy (BAE) is an ad hoc, temporary business initiative bringing together a comprehensive network of businesses, large and small, from around the world, through the representation of their associations, drawn from many sectors and regions.

Purpose

BAE has been established to coordinate business input into the 14th and 15th sessions (May 2006 and 2007) of the UN Commission on Sustainable Development (UNCSD), which will focus on energy, industrial development, atmosphere and climate change, and to other important forums in that timeframe. 

It will do so by coordinating the delivery of international business views, positions, or recommendations, and by communicating the depth and variety of activities and projects undertaken by businesses, often in partnership with governments, international, regional and local agencies, and NGOs, in pursuit of a more sustainable energy future.

Participants

BAE brings together international, regional and sector organizations, representing oil, gas, nuclear, coal, electricity and other major energy producers and consumers. At the national level, members include national committees, chambers, chapters of international business organizations and sector associations.  The current list of confirmed participating organizations, including the founding organizations, are the:

International Chamber of Commerce (ICC)
World Business Council for Sustainable Development (WBCSD)
World Energy Council (WEC)
International Aluminium Institute (IAI)
IPIECA, The global oil and gas industry association for environmental and social issues
Union of the Electricity Industry - EURELECTRIC 
World Coal Institute (WCI)
World Nuclear Association (WNA)
World LP Gas Association (WLPGA)
International Emissions Trading Association (IETA)
International Hydropower Association (IHA)

External links
 Business Action for Energy

Sustainable energy
International trade associations
Energy organizations